Chilenia was an ancient microcontinent or terrane whose history affected many of the older rocks of central Chile and western Argentina. It was once separated by oceanic crust from the Cuyania terrane to which it accreted at ~420-390 Ma when Cuyania was already amalgamated with Gondwana.

See also

References

Sources
The Andes - Tectonic Evolution

Geology of Chile
Geology of Argentina
Geology of the Andes
Historical continents
Paleozoic
Terranes